Carl Crack (born Karl Böhm, 5 May 1971 – 6 September 2001) was a Swazi-born German techno artist best known for his membership in the digital hardcore band Atari Teenage Riot from 1992 to 2000.

Biography
Around 1992, Crack displayed little interest in the music scene as it was at the time. He felt that The Beatnigs (the original vehicle for social and political critic Michael Franti, later of the Disposable Heroes of Hiphoprisy and Spearhead) were one of the few significant bands around. Along with the other members of Atari Teenage Riot he was looking for a new direction.

Crack initially had a significant influence on ATR's style, particularly on the first two albums where he developed an MC style which owed less to the U.S. than his own imagination. He also had his own musical ideas that could not be expressed within the confines of a group, leading to his only solo release, Black Ark, in 1998. It is, as the name suggests, heavily influenced by dub and in particular Lee Perry.

After heavy touring to promote ATR's third album, 60 Second Wipe Out, the members of the group commenced work on follow ups to their various solo projects. Crack appeared on Cobra Killer's 2002 album, The Third Armpit. He also was part of Firewire and Whatever, both with Din-St.

Crack was working on a new record before he was found dead in his apartment in Berlin, on 6 September 2001. He was 30 years old.

Discography

Album
 Black Ark (DHR Limited 1998)

DJ Mix
 Lion MC/Dance the Monkey (Midiwar 1995)

References

External links
 Biography at Digital Hardcore Recordings
 Carl Crack at Discogs

1971 births
2001 deaths
Drug-related deaths in Germany
20th-century German musicians
20th-century German male musicians
Atari Teenage Riot members
German people of Swazi descent